Jason Whittaker may refer to:

 Jason Whittaker (cricketer) (born 1971), English cricketer
 Jason Whittaker (Adventures in Odyssey)